George Melville Baker (1832–1890) was a playwright and publisher in Boston, Massachusetts, in the 19th century. He worked for Lee & Shepard publishers, then opened his own imprint. "George M. Baker & Co." issued works by authors such as  Henry M. Baker, F.E. Chase, and Herbert Pelham Curtis. Baker's company ceased in 1885, succeeded by his brother's "Walter H. Baker & Co." George Baker also performed with comedian Henry C. Barnabee, appearing in "lyceum entertainments" in New England. He belonged to the Mercantile Library Association. He married Emily Bowles in 1858; children included novelist Emilie Loring, playwright Rachel Baker Gale, and screenwriter Robert Melville Baker.

References

Further reading

External links

 
 
 
 Portrait of George M. Baker 
 Portrait of Albert Baker (1810-1874). "Printer [in Boston]. Father of Walter H. Baker and George Melville Baker"
 

1832 births
1890 deaths
Writers from Boston
19th century in Boston
American publishers (people)
19th-century American dramatists and playwrights
19th-century American businesspeople